The North Atlantic Conference (NAC) is an athletic conference, affiliated with the NCAA ’s Division III, consisting primarily of small liberal arts colleges in the Northern New England states of Maine and Vermont, as well as New York.

The conference was founded in 1996 when six colleges agreed to form the North Atlantic Women's Conference. It changed to its current name in the fall of 1999. It currently sponsors a total of 17 men's and women's sports played by teams of the 13 institutions therein.

The 17 different sports that are played in the NAC range from the fall season, throughout the winter, and to the spring season. These sports are played among both men's and women's teams.

In the fall season, there are six sports played. Among these are, Men's and Women's Cross Country, Field Hockey, Men's Golf, Men's and Women's Soccer, Women's Tennis, and Women's Volleyball.

In the winter season there are two sports played, which are Men's and Women's Basketball along with Men's and Women's Swimming and Diving.

In the spring time there are four sports both for men's and women's teams. The NAC has Men's and Women's Lacrosse, Baseball, Softball, Men's Tennis, and Men's and Women's Outdoor Track & Field.

History

Chronological timeline

 Fall 1996 - Bay Path, Lesley, Lasell, Wheelock, Maine Maritime Academy and Massachusetts College of Pharmacy explore the opportunity to join and form an athletic conference to give women student-athletes an opportunity to compete in a post-season tournament.
 Spring 1997 - The above named institutions work out the details to create an athletic conference to be known as the North Atlantic Women's Conference (NAWC). The steps for a constitution and set bylaws is drafted, championship hosting criteria are established and dates chosen for a spring softball championship.
 Fall 1997 - The first full academic year for the NAWC brings additional meetings to continue to make policy and procedures more formalized.  Championships are to be held in women's soccer, cross-country, basketball and softball.
 Spring 1998 - Basketball holds first NAWC Championship at Lasell College.
 Fall 1998 - Becker, Elms and Mount Ida Colleges are interviewed and accepted for membership starting Fall 1999.
 Spring 1999 - Basketball holds its first NAWC Championship at Maine Maritime Academy.
 Fall 1999 - North Atlantic Conference (NAC) begins first season of competition, new members include: Becker, Elms and Mount Ida Colleges.  There are 8 members of the NAC. Championships include both women and men.
 Spring 2000 - The North Atlantic Conference conducts women's and men's championships for basketball and softball.
 Fall 2000 - The North Atlantic Conference continues to expand postseason championship opportunities for its student-athletes.  Two new associate members are added for women's field hockey, Simmons College and Western New England College.
 Spring 2001 - The North Atlantic Conference begins preliminary discussions with potential new NAC members.
 Fall 2001 - The North Atlantic Conference continues to expand the post season championship opportunities for its student-athletes.  Five institutions apply and present to NAC members for admittance to the NAC for Fall 2002 academic year. Two institutions; Castleton State College (VT) and Johnson State College (VT) apply for full members status. Three Maine institutions are seeking associate membership for women's field hockey, Thomas, Husson and UMaine Farmington. The NAC approves its first major expansion in 2 years, bringing the NAC membership to 10 full members and 5 associate members.
 Spring 2002 - The 3 Maine institutions with associate membership status continue talks about joining the NAC as full members for the fall of 2003-2004. 
 Fall 2002 - The NAC receives confirmation that it will be recognized as a non-voting member of the NCAA Division III.  Dr. Carol Matteson of Mount Ida College begins a two-year term at President of the NAC. The automatic qualifier opportunities for women's sports begin a two-year waiting period before being instituted.
 Fall 2002 - Three institutions, Thomas, Husson and UMaine Farmington apply and present for full member consideration in September 2002  for admittance to the NAC for the Fall 2003 academic year.  The NAC accepts the three associate members for full NAC membership in Fall 2003.  The NAC approves its second major expansion in 3 years, bringing the NAC membership to 13 full members and 2 associate members. 
 Fall 2002 - The North Atlantic Conference continues to expand the post season championship opportunities for its student-athletes. Fall sports teams now compete with championships being expanded to include both full and associate members, increasing the championships sponsored to include: women's volleyball, soccer, field hockey and cross country and men's soccer and cross country.
 Spring 2003 - The NAC members meet at NCAA Convention to continue to chart the future course for the NAC. The members meet in Portsmouth, NH for membership meeting and to set the agenda for the President's Meeting in May.  The NAC conducts women's and men's basketball championships. For the second year in a row, the NAC sends a men's team, Lasell College, to the NCAA tournament as an at-large bid. The NAC holds a spring championship for softball. Elms College wins and receives an at-large bid to play in the NCAA softball championship.
 Spring 2003 - Presidents and Directors of Athletics meet for the first time in NAC history to discuss various issues on the future of the NAC.  Strategic planning, mission statement, travel and web development are discussed.
 Fall 2004 - Tournament Champions in Field Hockey, Men's and Women's Soccer, and Volleyball receive the conference's automatic qualifier to participate in the NCAA Tournament. Maine-Farmington, which claimed the 2004 NAC Field Hockey Championship, upends Keene State in the first round of the 2004 NCAA Division III Field Hockey Tournament, 3-2 in double overtime on November 10 being the first NAC school to advance past the first round of NCAA championship play.
 Winter 2005 - Elms ends a dominant three-year run by Lasell in the Men's Basketball Championship, upending the top-seeded Lasers 70-66. Maine Maritime earns its third NAC Women's Basketball Championship in seven years with a 65-56 win over intrastate rival UMaine-Farmington. Both victors receive the automatic qualifier to the NCAA Division III Tournament for the first time.
 Spring 2005 - Baseball and Men's Lacrosse both feature for the first time seven teams competing for the NAC Championship and begin the two-year waiting period for automatic qualification to the NACC Tournament. For Baseball, Elms and Husson along with associate member St. Joseph's (ME) compete for the first time in league play, with St. Joseph's taking the 2005 championship. Maine Maritime and Thomas fielded Men's Lacrosse for the first time ever, and were joined by associate members Daniel Webster and Emerson. Mount Ida continued its dominance in Men's Lacrosse, going undefeated for the second season in a row and taking the 2005 NAC Tournament. Maine-Farmington takes the 2005 NAC Softball Championship for the first time in dramatic fashion, winning four straight games, the final in extra innings over Elms.
 Spring 2005 - Julie Muller becomes the commissioner of the North Atlantic Conference on May 1, 2005. Inheriting the title from Mount Ida Athletic Director, Dr. Jacqueline Palmer, she becomes the first person to hold the sole title of commissioner for the 13-member NCAA Division III conference. The NAC begins an extensive evaluation of the conference and plans to initiate its first strategic planning process. Dr. Carol Matteson agrees to extend her term in office as President of the Presidents Council for an additional year.
 Spring 2006 - President Dave Wolk, Castleton, is elected to the position of Chair for the Presidents Council, taking over the post from President Carol Matteson of Mount Ida College.  St. Joseph's College of Maine earns an At Large Bid to the NCAA tournament in Baseball. NAC begins to explore adding football as an NAC championship sport.
 Fall 2006 - Mount Ida College and Lasell College begin final year of NAC competition as conference full members after withdrawing from the conference as full members. Both are accepted as Associate Members beginning Fall of 2007; Mount Ida for Men's Lacrosse and Lasell for Field Hockey. Western New England College participates in its final year as associate members in field hockey.
 Spring 2007 - Mount Ida College earns the first NAC automatic qualifier in Men's Lacrosse. During its last season of competition in NAC baseball,  St. Joseph's College earns the first automatic qualifier awarded the conference in that sport. Husson College represents the NAC as the automatic qualifier in Men's Golf. Green Mountain College and Lyndon State College present for full membership consideration during the NAC Annual Meeting in York Harbor, Maine. Both institutions are accepted, to begin competition in Fall of 2008.  St. Joseph's College of Maine is accepted as associate members for field hockey, beginning competition in fall of 2008. Presidents Council votes to begin NAC competition in football in the fall of 2009.
 Fall 2007 - Bay Path College, Becker College, Elms College, Lesley University and Wheelock College begin their final year of competition as full conference members after withdrawing from the NAC. Applications for associate membership in football are accepted and under consideration for competition to begin fall of 2009.
 Fall 2008 - Green Mountain College and Lyndon State College join the conference as full members.
 Fall 2011 - Colby–Sawyer College and New England College join the conference as full members.
 Spring 2012 - Castleton earns NAC's first women's lacrosse automatic qualifier awarded to the conference in that sport with an 18-11 Win over Morrisville State.
 Spring 2013 - The NAC Presidents Council affirmed its commitment to respect and inclusion by placing their support behind a project aimed at combatting homophobia on campuses and recognizing the benefit of diversity at each of its membership institutions. 
 Fall 2014 - The 10 membership institutions of the NAC showed their commitment to promoting respect for all by developing a conference-wide You Can Play video project. 
 Spring 2015 - The NAC continues to expand the post season championship opportunities for its student-athletes with the addition of women's outdoor track and field. The NAC received national recognition from the NCAA after being selected as the February recipient of the Division III Diversity Spotlight Initiative for its work on the You Can Play video project.
 Fall 2015 - The NAC SAAC commits to embracing the It's On Us campaign as a conference wide initiative.
 Spring 2016 - The North Atlantic Conference continues to expand the post season championship opportunities for its student-athletes with the addition of men's outdoor track and field. 
 Summer 2016 - Marcella Zalot becomes the second ever full-time commissioner of the North Atlantic Conference on June 13, 2016.  Inheriting the title from Julie Muller, who served as the NAC's first full-time commissioner and retired on June 30, 2016. 
 Fall 2016 - Castleton University graduate Rachel Bombardier, the 2015-16 NAC Woman of the Year, was named one of 30 Top Honorees for the 2016 NCAA Woman of the Year Award. Bombardier becomes the first NAC woman to be selected in the final 30 student-athletes throughout the history of the award. UMaine Presque Isle competes as an associate member in the men's and women's NAC cross country championships and in the women's volleyball regular season and postseason.
 Winter 2017 - The NAC announced the additions of the University of Maine at Presque Isle and SUNY Canton as full members beginning in the fall of 2018. Both schools had been members of the American Collegiate Athletic Association.
 Fall 2018 – On November 30, 2018, the NAC announced that SUNY Delhi, already an associate member in six sports (men's golf, men's lacrosse, men's and women's tennis, and men's and women's track & field), would become a full member of the conference effective in the fall of 2019. At that time, five additional Delhi sports—men's and women's cross country, men's golf, men's and women's soccer, and women's volleyball—began NAC play. Three more sports—men's and women's basketball, plus softball—remained in the American Collegiate Athletic Association until starting NAC play in 2020–21.
 Fall 2019 – On August 20, 2019, the NAC announced that three schools—Cazenovia, SUNY Cobleskill, and SUNY Poly—would become full members in July 2020.
 Spring 2022 – On March 1, 2022, the NAC announced that SUNY Morrisville and Lesley College would join as full members in the 2023-24 season.

Member schools

Current members
The NAC currently has 12 full members, all but three are public schools. Departing member is highlighted in pink.

 Cazenovia will close the doors after the 2022–23 academic year.
 Northern Vermont–Johnson will downgrade its athletics to the USCAA after the 2023–24 academic year.

Notes

Future full members
The NAC will have three new full members, one will be a public school and the other two will be private schools:

Notes

Associate member
The NAC currently has one associate member, which is also a public school:

Former members
The NAC had 12 former full members, all but one were private schools:

Notes

Former associate members
The NAC had nine former associate members, all but two were private schools. This list includes only associate members that have completely departed the NAC. Current full members that had previously housed select sports in the NAC, such as SUNY Delhi, are not included.

Notes

Membership timeline

Sports

Championships

The NAC holds championships in the following sports:
Fall season: men's and women's cross country, field hockey, golf, men's and women's soccer, women's tennis, women's volleyball
Winter season: men's and women's basketball
Spring season: baseball, men's lacrosse, softball, men's tennis

References

External links
 

 
Articles which contain graphical timelines